PPPD may refer to:
 Point-to-Point Protocol daemon
 Pylorus-preserving pancreaticoduodenectomy, an operation for pancreatic cancer.

es:Pppd
it:Pppd
pl:Pppd
ru:Pppd